Lev Fyodorovich Mikhaylov (26 April 1938 – 31 August 2004) was a Soviet figure skater. He was a five-time Soviet national champion and placed in the top ten at four European Championships.

Mikhaylov began skating at an outdoor rink. He was coached by Georgy Felitsyn and was a member of DSO Spartak and CSK Moscow. After retiring from competition, he worked as a coach. His students included Tatiana Nemtsova and Elena Kotova.

Results

References

External links
 skatabase

Navigation

Soviet male single skaters
Russian male single skaters
1938 births
2004 deaths
Figure skaters from Moscow